Dan D (meaning D-Day in Slovene) is a popular Slovenian rock band that has been formed in 1996 in Novo Mesto and has published five albums till now.

Band members
The group was formed from the remnants of the Mercedes Band musical ensemble by the singer Tomislav Jovanovič (nicknamed Tokac) and the drummer Dušan Obradinovič (nicknamed Obra) who later invited his friend Marko Turk (Tučo) as the rhythm guitar, Primož Špelko as the bass guitar, and Aleš Bartelj as the solo guitar. After Primož Špelko and Aleš Bartelj left, the band invited the bass guitarist Andrej Zupančič and the keyboardist Boštjan Grubar, and Tokac started to also play guitar. In 2006, Andrej Zupančič was replaced by Nikola Sekulovič as the bass guitarist.

Performances
In March 2007, Dan D and the Siddharta band performed at the presentation of the Slovenian media award Viktor in the Cankar Hall in Ljubljana the joint version of the Dan D's Voda and the Siddharta's song Male roke. This version later became one of the biggest hits of the year in Slovenia. The next day the two groups were presented in the TV show Tistega lepega popoldneva, broadcast by TV Slovenija, the Slovenian national TV station.  

On 13 September and 14 September 2009, the band performed in Križanke, a performance place in Ljubljana, alongside the RTV Slovenia Symphony Orchestra. The concert was broadcast by TV Slovenija as well as by Val 202, the Slovenian national  radio station.

Discography 
 1997: Igra
 1999: Ko hodiš nad oblaki
 2004: Katere barve je tvoj dan
 2009: Ure letenja za ekstravagantne ptice
 2009: Dan 202 (live CD/DVD)
 2012: Poleno (limited edition music cassette)
 2013: Tiho (live acoustic CD)
 2015: DNA D

References

External links 
  

Slovenian rock music groups